Ramseh may refer to:
 Ramseh 1
 Ramseh 2